Triste may refer to:

Triste, a small settlement in Las Peñas de Riglos, Hoya de Huesca
El Triste (album), a 1970 album by José José 
El Triste (Zacarías Ferreíra album), 2000
Triste (Antônio Carlos Jobim song), a Brazilian song by Antônio Carlos Jobim
"El Triste", a song by José José

See also
Trieste (disambiguation)